Broome Senior High School is a comprehensive public co-educational high day school, located in Broome, a regional centre in the Kimberley region,  north east of Perth, Western Australia.

Overview 
The school was established in 1972 and by 2015 had an enrolment of 900 students between Year 7 and Year 12, approximately 40% of whom were Indigenous Australians.

The school was initially founded as a district high school in 1972, but in 1990 the senior high school and the primary school separated forming Broome Senior high School.

In 2008 the school was hit by fire causing over $50,000 in damage, including destroying a transportable classroom.

Enrolments at the school have increased as the Western Australia School system increased the number of high school years from 5 to 6. Much of growth is from these changes as well as the slow steady growth of Broome as a tourist and economic hub in the West Kimberley. 448 students in 2007, 502 in 2008, 527 in 2009, 511 in 2010, 492 in 2011 and 560 in 2012

The school has had R Dorn, G Ransom, G Downsborough, S Amin and M Burt as Principals.

See also
 
List of schools in rural Western Australia

References

External links
 Broome Senior High School website

Public high schools in Western Australia
1972 establishments in Australia
Educational institutions established in 1972
Broome, Western Australia